This is a list of the 30 Major League Baseball teams from the 2010 season, ranked by total team salary. Values only include salaries of players on their respective 2010 rosters.

References

Major League Baseball lists
Major League Baseball statistics
Major League Baseball, payroll, 2010